Vicente Segrelles (born 9 September 1940 in  Barcelona) is a Spanish comic book artist and writer.

Segrelles gained popularity in Europe for his painted comic book epic The Mercenary (El Mercenario), started in 1980. Set in a medieval fantasy world, El Mercenario follows the adventures of a mercenary in his fight against evil. Unusual for the craft of comic books, every panel of his work for this series—which has reached 14 issues so far—is painted in oil, a time-consuming process.

Segrelles was also the cover artist for the Italian science fiction magazine Urania from 1988 to 1991.

Bibliography
 1970 Lazarillo de Tormes/El licenciado Vidriera scripted by María Teresa Díaz
 1981 El Mercenario 1-El Pueblo del Fuego Sagrado for "Cimoc" 
 1983 El Mercenario 2-La Fórmula
 1984 El Mercenario 3-Las Pruebas 
 1988 El Mercenario 4-El Sacrificio 
 1991 El Mercenario 5-La Fortaleza
 1992 Histoires Fantastiques: Une Histoire du Mercenaire
 1992 El Sheriff Pat 1-Expediente Mojado
 1992 El Sheriff Pat 2-En la Santa María
 1992 Los Errores de Colón para "Cimoc" 
 1992 1992 (Published in various magazines)
 1993 El Mercenario 6-La Bola Negra 
 1993 Veinte años de Cómic
 1995 El Mercenario 7-El Viaje 
 1996 El Mercenario 8-Año Mil, el Fin del Mundo 
 1997 El Mercenario 9-Los Ascendientes Perdidos 
 1997 Un Alto en el Camino
 La Evidencia (Published in various magazines)
 1998 El Mercenario 10-Gigantes 
 1999 El Dragón
 2000 El Mercenario 11-La Huida 
 2002 El Mercenario 12-El Rescate 
 2003 El Mercenario 13-El Rescate II

See also 
 Josep Segrelles
 Segrelles Museum

References

External links
 
 

1940 births
Living people
Spanish comics artists
Artists from Catalonia
20th-century Spanish painters
20th-century Spanish male artists
Spanish male painters
21st-century Spanish painters
Science fiction artists
Fantasy artists
Painters from Barcelona
21st-century Spanish male artists